Alliance for Justice (AFJ) is a progressive judicial advocacy group in the United States. Founded in 1979 by former president Nan Aron, AFJ monitors federal judicial appointments. AFJ represents a coalition of 100 politically leftist groups that have an interest in the federal judiciary. The Alliance for Justice presents a modern liberal viewpoint on legal issues.

According to the organization, "AFJ works to ensure that the federal judiciary advances core constitutional values, preserves human rights and unfettered access to the courts, and adheres to the even-handed administration of justice for all Americans."

Judicial advocacy
AFJ launched the Judicial Selection Project in 1985 to monitor the federal judicial appointment system. According to AFJ's founder, Nan Aron, the organization wanted to guard against the ideological impact of Ronald Reagan's federal judicial nominees. AFJ objects to judicial nominees who oppose abortion or who promise to exercise judicial restraint. The organization provides background on prospective nominees to the American Bar Association and the Senate Judiciary Committee.

AFJ played a role in the defeat of Ronald Reagan nominee Robert Bork's nomination to the Supreme Court of the United States in 1987. In 2001, the organization supported the nomination of Roger Gregory, a Bill Clinton nominee and the first African-American judge in the Fourth Circuit in 2001. In 2013, AFJ supported President Barack Obama's three nominees for the United States Court of Appeals for the District of Columbia Circuit.

Member organizations 
AFJ reports a membership of over 120 organizations. On its website, as of January 7, 2021, AFJ lists the following member groups:

Abortion Care Network
Advancement Project
Advocates for Youth
AIDS United
Alliance for Safe Traffic Stops
Alliance for the Great Lakes
Alliance for Youth Organizing
Americans for Financial Reform Education Fund
Americans United for Separation of Church and State
Asian American Legal Defense and Education Fund
Bazelon Center for Mental Health Law
Bend the Arc: Jewish Action
Beneficial State Foundation
Business and Professional People for the Public Interest
California Women's Law Center
Center for Biological Diversity
Center for Constitutional Rights
Center for Digital Democracy
Center for Inquiry
Center for Law and Social Policy
Center for Reproductive Rights
Center for Science in the Public Interest
Children's Defense Fund
Clearinghouse on Women's Issues
Closing the Women's Wealth Gap
Community Catalyst
Community Partners
Compassion & Choices
Comprehensive Health Education Foundation
Conservation Campaign
Consumer Action
Culture Project
Dallas Women's Foundation
Defending Rights & Dissent
Disability Rights Education and Defense Fund
Dream Corps
Drug Policy Alliance
Earthjustice
Equal Justice Society
Equal Rights Advocates
Equality Federation
Every Child Matters
Faith in Action Network
Food Research & Action Center
Forests Forever
Free Press
Friends of the Earth
Great Plains Action Society
Harmon, Curran, Spielberg & Eisenberg, LLP
Houston in Action
Human Rights Campaign Foundation
International Center for Research on Women
Jewish Social Justice Roundtable
Jobs with Justice
Justice in Aging
Juvenile Law Center
Lambda Legal
Latino Community Foundation
Lawyers' Committee for Civil Rights Under Law
League of Conservation Voters Education Fund
Legal Aid Association of California
Legal Aid at Work
Little Lobbyists
Los Angeles Alliance for a New Economy
MAZON: A Jewish Response to Hunger
Methodist Healthcare Ministries
Mexican American Legal Defense and Educational Fund
Mi Familia Vota
Muslim Advocates
NARAL Pro-Choice America Foundation
National Abortion Federation
National Association of Consumer Advocates
National Association of Councils on Developmental Disabilities
National Association of Criminal Defense Lawyers
National Center for Law and Economic Justice
National Center for Lesbian Rights
National Center for Transgender Equality
National Center for Youth Law
National Committee for Responsive Philanthropy
National Council of Jewish Women
National Education Association
National Employment Lawyers Association
National Family Planning and Reproductive Health Association
National Immigration Forum
National Immigration Law Center
National Korean American Service & Education Consortium
National Law Center on Homelessness and Poverty
National Lawyers Guild
National Legal Aid & Defender Association
National LGBTQ Task Force
National Parks Conservation Association
National Partnership for Women and Families
National Veterans Legal Services Program
National Women's Law Center
Native American Rights Fund
Natural Resources Defense Council
North Texas Dream Team
Peak Grantmaking
People's Action
Planned Parenthood Federation of America
PolicyLink
Public Advocates
RAICES
Rockefeller Philanthropies Advisors
Secular Coalition for America
Secular Woman
Service Employees International Union
Shriver Center on Poverty Law
SIECUS
Sierra Club Foundation
Southern California Grantmakers
Southern Poverty Law Center
States United to Prevent Gun Violence
Texas Council on Family Violence
Texas Women's Foundation
The Arc
The Climate Project
The Impact Fund
Tides Center
Transgender Law Center
UFW Foundation
Violence Policy Center
Younger Women's Task Force, Greater Lafayette Chapter
YWCA

References

External links 

Legal advocacy organizations in the United States
Progressive organizations in the United States
Organizations established in 1979
1974 establishments in California
501(c)(3) organizations